Dryland farming and dry farming encompass specific agricultural techniques for the non-irrigated cultivation of crops. Dryland farming is associated with drylands, areas characterized by a cool wet season (which charges the soil with virtually all the moisture that the crops will receive prior to harvest) followed by a warm dry season. They are also associated with arid conditions, areas prone to drought and those having scarce water resources.

Process 

Dryland farming has evolved as a set of techniques and management practices used by farmers to continually adapt to the presence or lack of moisture in a given crop cycle. In marginal regions, a farmer should be financially able to survive occasional crop failures, perhaps for several years in succession. Survival as a dryland farmer requires careful husbandry of the moisture available for the crop and aggressive management of expenses to minimize losses in poor years. Dryland farming involves the constant assessing of the amount of moisture present or lacking for any given crop cycle and planning accordingly. Dryland farmers know that to be financially successful they have to be aggressive during the good years in order to offset the dry years.

Dryland farming is dependent on natural rainfall, which can leave the ground vulnerable to dust storms, particularly if poor farming techniques are used or if the storms strike at a particularly vulnerable time. The fact that a fallow period must be included in the crop rotation means that fields cannot always be protected by a cover crop, which might otherwise offer protection against erosion.

Some of the theories of dryland farming developed in the late 19th and early 20th centuries claimed to be scientific but were in reality pseudoscientific and did not stand up to empirical testing. For example, it was alleged that tillage would seal in moisture, but such "dust mulching" ideas are based on what people imagine should happen, or have been told, rather than what testing actually confirms. In actuality, it has been shown that tillage increases water losses to evaporation. The book Bad Land: An American Romance explores the effects that this had on people who were encouraged to homestead in an area with little rainfall; most smallholdings failed after working miserably to cling on.

Dry farming depends on making the best use of the "bank" of soil moisture that was created by winter rainfall. Some dry farming practices include:

 Wider than normal spacing, to provide a larger bank of moisture for each plant.
 Controlled Traffic.
 Minimal tilling of land.
 Strict weed control, to ensure that weeds do not consume soil moisture needed by the cultivated plants.
 Cultivation of soil to produce a "dust mulch", thought to prevent the loss of water through capillary action. This practice is controversial, and is not universally advocated.
 Selection of crops and cultivars suited for dry farming practices.

Locations 

Dry farming may be practiced in areas that have significant annual rainfall during a wet season, often in the winter.  Crops are cultivated during the subsequent dry season, using practices that make use of the stored moisture in the soil. California, Colorado, Kansas, South Dakota, North Dakota, Montana, Nebraska, Oklahoma, Oregon, Washington, and Wyoming, in the United States, are a few states where dry farming is practiced for a variety of crops.

Dryland farming is used in the Great Plains, the Palouse plateau of Eastern Washington, and other arid regions of North America such as in the Southwestern United States and Mexico (see Agriculture in the Southwestern United States and Agriculture in the prehistoric Southwest), the Middle East and in other grain growing regions such as the steppes of Eurasia and Argentina. Dryland farming was introduced to southern Russia and Ukraine by Ukrainian Mennonites under the influence of Johann Cornies, making the region the breadbasket of Europe. In Australia, it is widely practiced in all states but the Northern Territory.

Crops 

Dry farmed crops may include grapes, tomatoes, pumpkins, beans, and other summer crops. Dryland grain crops include wheat, corn, millet, rye, and other grasses that produce grains. These crops grow using the winter water stored in the soil, rather than depending on rainfall during the growing season.

Dryland farmed crops may include winter wheat, maize, beans, sunflowers or even watermelon. The choice of crop is influenced by the timing of the predominant rainfall in relation to the seasons. For example, winter wheat is more suited to regions with higher winter rainfall while areas with summer wet seasons may be more suited to summer growing crops such as sorghum, sunflowers or cotton.
Everyone knows that plants need water, soil, oxygen and sunlight in order to grow strong and healthy, but what happens when water is scarce?  Modern farming solutions to this problem include irrigation systems that can direct water to rows of crops in huge fields, but some farmers believe that a return to dry farming is the solution.

Dry Farming is a natural technique that utilizes rainwater and water leached from the ground in dry environments. Groundwater supply is often the result of melted snow and ice in climates that experience high precipitation in the winter and dry heat in the summer. Water from nearby watershed sources can also be used in dry farming, and some believe that the use of dry farms could solve not only food shortage challenges in small communities but also climate change concerns.

Other considerations 

In the Horse Heaven Hills in central Washington, wheat farming has been productive purportedly on an average annual rainfall approaching 6 inches. Consequently, moisture must be captured until the crop can utilize it. Techniques include summer fallow rotation (in which one crop is grown on two seasons' precipitation, leaving standing stubble and crop residue to trap snow), and preventing runoff by terracing fields. "Terracing" is also practiced by farmers on a smaller scale by laying out the direction of furrows to slow water runoff downhill, usually by plowing along either contours or keylines. Moisture can be conserved by eliminating weeds and leaving crop residue to shade the soil.
 Effective use of available moisture Once moisture is available for the crop to use, it must be used as effectively as possible. Seed planting depth and timing are carefully considered to place the seed at a depth at which sufficient moisture exists, or where it will exist when seasonal precipitation falls. Farmers tend to use crop varieties which are drought-tolerant and heat-stress tolerant (even lower-yielding varieties). Thus the likelihood of a successful crop is hedged if seasonal precipitation fails.
 Soil conservation The nature of dryland farming makes it particularly susceptible to erosion, especially wind erosion. Some techniques for conserving soil moisture (such as frequent tillage to kill weeds) are at odds with techniques for conserving topsoil. Since healthy topsoil is critical to sustainable agriculture, in particular within arid areas, its preservation is generally considered the most important long-term goal of a dryland farming operation.  Erosion control techniques such as windbreaks, reduced tillage or no-till, spreading straw (or other mulch on particularly susceptible ground), and strip farming are used to minimize topsoil loss.

 Weedling Weedling is process of turning over 90 degree and exposing weed's root during tillage to prevent soil erosion by wind and desertification. At the same time, Direct absorption of nutrients from weeds and moisture provides suitable environment  to floris biodiversity of organisms in soil.

 Control of input costs Dryland farming is practiced in regions inherently marginal for non-irrigated agriculture. Because of this, there is an increased risk of crop failure and poor yields which may occur in a dry year (regardless of money or effort expended). Dryland farmers must evaluate the potential yield of a crop constantly throughout the growing season and be prepared to decrease inputs to the crop such as fertilizer and weed control if it appears that it is likely to have a poor yield due to insufficient moisture. Conversely, in years when moisture is abundant, farmers may increase their input efforts and budget to maximize yields and to offset poor harvests.

Arid-zone agriculture 

As an area of research and development, arid-zone agriculture, or desert agriculture, includes studies of how to increase the agricultural productivity of lands dominated by lack of freshwater, an abundance of heat and sunlight, and usually one or more of: Extreme winter cold, short rainy season, saline soil or water, strong dry winds, poor soil structure, over-grazing, limited technological development, poverty, or political instability.

The two basic approaches are:

 View the given environmental and socioeconomic characteristics as negative obstacles to be overcome.
 View as many as possible of them as positive resources to be used.

See also 
 Agriculture in Israel
 Agriculture in the prehistoric Southwest
 Arid Forest Research Institute
 Biosalinity
 Dust Bowl
 Environmental issues with agriculture
 International Center for Agricultural Research in the Dry Areas
 Irrigation
 Seawater greenhouse
 Small-scale agriculture
 University of Arid Agriculture
 Xerophyte

References 

10. Dry Farming Dry Farming Everyone knows that plants need water, soil, oxygen and sunlight in order to grow strong and healthy,

Further reading 

 Henry Gilbert, Dryland Farming: January 1982–December 1990 (Beltsville, Md.: U.S. Department of Agriculture, National Agricultural Library, 1991)
 Mary W. M. Hargraves, Dry Farming in the Northern Great Plains: Years of Readjustment, 1920–1990 (Lawrence: University of Kansas, 1993)
 Oklahoma State Board of Agriculture, Report (Guthrie, OK: n.p. 1908)
 Dr. John A. Widtsoe, Ph.D. Dry-Farming, A System Of Agriculture For Countries Under A Low Rainfall (NY: The Macmillan Company, 1911)
 Victor Squires and Philip Tow, Dryland Farming: A Systems Approach – An Analysis of Dryland Agriculture in Australia (Sydney: Sydney University Press, 1991)
 O'Bar, Scott, (2013). Alternative Crops for Drylands – Proactively Adapting to Climate Change and Water Shortages. Amaigabe Press, Santa Barbara, CA 
 Encyclopedia of Oklahoma History and Culture – Dry Farming
 P. Koohafkan and B.A. Stewart, Water and Cereals in Drylands published by The Food and Agriculture Organization of the United Nations and Earthscan (PDF)
 Steve Solomon, Water-Wise Vegetables: For the Maritime Northwest Gardener (Sasquatch Books, 1993)

External links 

 

Agriculture by type